Ahmed Mohamed Salah El Din El Sakka (born March 1, 1973) is an Egyptian action actor. The son of theatre director Salah El Sakka, he began his career with uncredited roles in a lot of films and television series, until he made his breakthrough role in the Egyptian comedy films An Upper Egyptian at the American University (1998) and Hamam in Amsterdam (1999). El Sakka is known for action roles and doing dangerous scenes without any double. He starred in the romantic comedy Short, Fanelah & Cap (2000), the adventure film Africano (2001) and the action films Mafia (2002), Tito (2004) and Italy War (2005). He also starred in the romantic drama About Love and Passion (2006), the biographical film The Island (2007), the actions Taymour and Shafika (2007), Ibrahim Labyad (2009) and The Dealer (2010), and the comedy drama The Consul's Son (2010).

El Sakka also starred in the comedy film Papa (2012), the action film The Benefit (2012), the sequel of The Island, The Island 2 (2014), the thriller film 30 Years Ago (2016), the action film Forced Escape (2017) and the drama film 200 Pounds (2021).

El Sakka starred in a lot of television series, including the drama Red Lines (2012), the actions Roundtrip (2015) and The Black Horse (2017), and the dramas Son of the Poor (2019) and Offspring of Strangers (2021).

El Sakka made his debut theatre role in Khodlak A'leb and participated in Alabanda (1998), Afroto (2000) and That's Ok (2003).

Early life 
His father, Salah El Sakka, was a theatre director who died in 2010, and his mother, Nadia Alsrouji, is the daughter of Egyptian singer Abdo Alsrouji. Salah El Sakka directed a lot of plays, including El Leila El Kebira. El Sakka studied in Academy of Arts and graduated from The Higher Institute of Dramatic Arts in 1993.

Early career 
Early in his acting career, he appeared in popular series like Al Nawa (1991) with Fardous Abdel Hamid, Alf Leila Wa Leila (One Thousand and One Nights, 1995) and Nesf Rabeea El-Akhar (1996) with Yehia El-Fakharany, W Man Allazi La Yoheb Fatma? (And Who Does not Love Fatima?, 1996) with Ahmed Abdelaziz and Shereen Seif El-Nasr, Tarweed El-Sharesa (Taming the Fierce, 1996) with Athar El-Hakim, a major role in Rodda Qalbi (1998), the adaptation of the original film Rodda Qalbi (Back Again, 1957), playing the role of Hussein, which was previously played by Salah Zulfikar in the original film, and a major role in Zawag Ala Wark Solifan (1998). El Sakka also appeared in a lot of films such as Leila Sakhina (A Hot Night, 1995) with Nour El-Sherif and Ayam El-Sadat (The Days of Sadat, 2001) with Ahmed Zaki.

The role that introduced him to a large audience was a co-starring role with actor Mohamed Henedi in Sa'edi fe el gama'a el amrekiya (An Upper Egyptian at the American University, 1998). It is an Arabic movie about a farmer who entered the American University in the city. The following year, he co-starred with Mohamed Henedi in Hamam fi Amsterdam (Hamam in Amsterdam, 1999), but in a larger role of the tough guy, which seemed to be his role in most of his hit movies afterwards. El Sakka also co-starred with Henedi in the two plays Alabanda (1998) and Afroto (1999).

El Sakka's first starring role in cinema was in Short W Fanelah W Cap (Short, Fanelah & Cap, 2000) with Sherif Mounir, Ahmed Eid, Dalia Mostafa and the newcomer at that time Nour, achieving a huge financial success, with El Sakka winning Best Actor Award at Cairo International Film Festival. In 2001, he starred in Africano with Mona Zaki, which made a huge success and grossed 8 million EGP. El Sakka made a cameo role in Rasha Gareaa (Dare to give, 2001) and voiced Milo in the Arabic version of the animated film Atlantis: The Lost Empire (2001). His next films were all action movies where he played the main character. Probably, the most famous of these movies is Mafia (2002), which was a big success for El Sakka and is considered by many as one of the best action actors in the history of Egyptian movies. The film, which also starred Mostafa Shaban, Ahmed Rizk and Mona Zaki, grossed about 13 million EGP. In 2003, El Sakka co-starred in the play Keda Ok (That's Ok) with Sherif Mounir, Hany Ramzy, Mona Zaki and Yasmin Abdulaziz. He made a starring role in Tito (2004) with Hanan Tork and Khaled Saleh, which grossed 11.5 million EGP. He made a guest role in Leqaa ala al hawaa (2004), starring Yousra, and a voice role in the beginning of Sana Oula Nasb (First Year of Deception, 2004).

In 2005, El Sakka starred in Harb Atalia (Italy War) with Nelly Karim and grossed about 13 million EGP. also he was a cameo in Hamada Yal'ab (Hamada is Playing, 2005). In 2006, he starred with Mona Zaki again in An El Ashk We El Hawa (About Love and Passion), which also starred Menna Shalabi and Tarek Lotfy. The film was a Box-office bomb and grossed only 9 million EGP. El Sakka appeared in the part 1 and 2 of Lahazat Harega (Critical Moments, 2007) and in 2007, he starred in 2 films, Taymour W Shafika (Taymour and Shafika) and El-Jazeera (The Island). In the first one, he played a private security guard and the film grossed 17 million EGP, and in the last one, he played The Outlaw Mansour El Hefny, who challenged a corrupt policeman, and the film grossed 22 million EGP. El-Jazeera, which based on the story of The Emperor of An Nikhaylah, Ezzat Hanafi, received an Academy Award for Best International Feature Film nomination but did not win. In 2009, El Sakka played the titular role of Ibrahim Labyad, which was one of the Egyptian «popular culture films» that received criticism, praise, and mixed reviews about the nature of society in it. Although it was criticized for the scenes of blood and bullying, the film grossed 12 million EGP. It was screened at the International Market of Cannes Film Festival.

In 2010, El Sakka appeared in 2 movies, Al-Dealer (The Dealer) and Ibn Alqonsol (The Consul's Son). Al-Dealer, which also starred Khaled El Nabawy and Mai Selim, grossed only 5 million EGP in 5 weeks before it's drawing from cinema. Ibn Alqonsol, starred El Sakka, Ghada Adel and Khaled Saleh, grossed 14 million EGP. El Sakka was a cameo in Sameer W Shaheer W Baheer (Sameer, Shaheer & Baheer) and Ayza Atgawez (I Want to Get Married). He starred in Khotout Hamra (Red Lines, 2012), which was released in Ramadan. In 2012, he starred opposite Ahmed Ezz in Al-Maslaha (The Benefit) and the film made 21 million EGP. The film was based on a story happened in 2010 in Sinai. El Sakka starred alongside Dorra in Papa in 2012, grossing 12 million EGP. In 2014, he reprised his role as Mansour El Hefny in El-Jazeera 2 (The Island 2), which grossed 36 million EGP, making it the highest-grossing film in the history of Egyptian cinema at that time, until the release of Laf We Dawaran (Flimflam, 2016), which grossed 43 million EGP.

In 2015, El Sakka starred in Thahab Wa Awda (Roundtrip) and released in Ramadan. Thahab Wa Awda, which also starred Injy El Mokkaddem, Magdy Kamel, Yasser Galal, Jamil Awwad and his wife Juliet Awwad, was based on one of intelligence stories that happened in 2012. In 2016, El Sakka co-starred with Sherif Mounir, Nour, Mona Zaki and Mervat Amin in Min Talatin Sana (30 Years Ago) and the film grossed more than 23 million EGP. El Sakka's 2017 movie Horob Edterary (Forced Escape) grossed 55 million EGP. It also starred Amir Karara, Ghada Adel and Mostafa Khater. In Ramadan 2017, El Sakka starred in Alhisan Al'aswad (The Black Horse), which also starred Yasmine Sabri and Shery Adel. He appeared in Harb Karmouz (Karmouz War) and Rahim, both in 2018. He starred in 2019 Ramadan series Weld El-Ghalaba (Son of the Poor) with Mai Omar and Injy El Mokkaddem.

El Sakka co-presented with Razan Moughrabi the 2020 Ramadan program Eghlab El Sakka (Beat El Sakka). He co-starred with Amir Karara in Nasl El Aghrab (Offspring of Strangers, 2021), which had a huge criticism and ridicule, making the United Media Services stop dealing with Mohamed Sami, the director and writer of the series. El Sakka played a major role in 200 Geneh (200 pounds, 2021), after 4 years of absence from the cinema since his movie Horob Edterary (2017). 200 Geneh grossed 8 million EGP only. El Sakka received GFF's Career Achievement Award at the fifth El Gouna Film Festival. In 2022, he starred in Al Ekhtiar 3 (The Choice 3) alongside Ahmed Ezz, Karim Abdel Aziz and Yasser Galal.

Personal life 
El Sakka married the daughter of the make-up artist and hairdresser Mohamed Al Sagheer, Maha Al Sagheer, on November 17, 1999. They had 3 children, 2 sons and a daughter. Their children are Yassin, Hamza and Nadia.

El Sakka known for his love of horses and their breeding, as he own a lot of horses and has an excellent skills of horse riding and training it. He has Arabian horse stable in Nazlet El-Semman. His hobbies are: horse riding, shooting, football, singing, writing songs and traveling.

El Sakka is a Stunt performer and he got injured in a lot of his films. He declared in Lamis Elhadidy's program Kelma Akhira that while shooting Short W Fanelah W Cap and after he jumped in the sea, the sharks would have eaten him. He stayed fixed in his place in the water and didn't swim; because the shark think that the human who swims is similar to the dolphin, so it will attack on him. He continued that he remained standing in the water until they shot the scene. While shooting Mafia, he cut off his cruciate ligament and got a lot of wounds because of many sand dunes in a mountain, in addition, he almost drowned in a scene, according to what he said in Sahebat El-Sa'da. In Africano and while making an ambush to the lion by tying a slaughtered chicken with a rope connected to a hole where the lion was supposed to fall, then El Sakka will come down to him, the rope that tied him up while going down was almost cut off and he almost died. And in Ukraine while shooting Taymour W Shafika, the fire caught his clothes. El Sakka lost temporarily his eyesight while shooting El-Jazeera, due to splinters from starting pistol entered his left eye, resulting an explosion in his eyeball and its bleeding. He was taken to hospital for an urgent surgery and after a few days, he began regaining his eyesight gradually. While shooting Ibrahim Labyad at the location of National Democratic Party in Cairo Citadel, El Sakka got injured in his foot when he came down the stairs, because of a sprain in his ankle, making the filming of the movie was postponed. The scene of his body set on fire was really, as he was wearing a suit that isolate the fire for 11 seconds. After 11 seconds, he didn't hear the scene designer telling him to get down on the ground, so the scene designer hit him on the head until he fell to the ground and put out the fire. Marwan Hamed, the director of the film, wanted to re-shoot the scene, but in a simpler way. After shooting El-Dealer, El Sakka discovered a cruciate ligament injury that required an emergency surgery, but he was recovered after a while. Also in El-Jazeera 2, he was badly injured.

Filmography

Awards and nominations

References

External links

 
 Ahmed El Sakka at  
 Ahmed El Sakka Photoalbum and Filmography

1973 births
Living people
Egyptian male television actors
Male actors from Cairo
20th-century Egyptian male actors
21st-century Egyptian male actors
Egyptian male film actors
Egyptian male stage actors
Egyptian comedians
Egyptian Muslims